Yui Kamiji and Jordanne Whiley defeated the defending champions Jiske Griffioen and Aniek van Koot in the final, 7–6(7–3), 3–6, [10–8] to win the women's doubles wheelchair tennis title at the 2014 French Open. It was their second step towards an eventual Grand Slam.

Seeds
 Jiske Griffioen /  Aniek van Koot (final)
 Yui Kamiji /  Jordanne Whiley (champions)

Draw

Finals

References
 Draw

Wheelchair Women's Doubles
French Open, 2014 Women's Doubles